Nelson Faria (born March 23, 1963) is a Brazilian guitarist.

Career
At the Guitar Institute of Technology in California, his teachers included Joe Diorio, Frank Gambale, Ted Greene, Scott Henderson, and Joe Pass.  On television he performed with Paulo Moura on Rhapsody in Bossa, with Baby do Brasil on Acústico, and with Leila Pinheiro on Na Ponta da Língua. His debut album, Ioiô, was released in 1993. He recorded a Brazilian tribute to the Beatles with Bororó, Marcos Suzano, and José Namen. Faria has also worked with Nana Caymmi, Zélia Duncan, Cássia Eller, Edu Lobo, and Milton Nascimento.

Discography 
 1993 Ioiô (Perfil)
 1998 Beatles, um tributo Brasileiro
 1999 Janelas Abertas (Lumiar Discos)
 2003 Nelson Faria
 2005 Vento Bravo
 2009 Buxixo with Gilson Peranzzetta (Delira)
 2010 Leila Pinheiro, Banda Pequi e Nelson Faria (UFG)
 2011 Live in Frankfurt with Frankfurt Radio Big Band
 2012 Ceu e Mar with Leila Pinheiro
 2012 Na esquina de Mestre Mignone with Gustavo Tavares

DVDs 
 Toques de Mestre (Giannini SA, 1990)
 Nosso Trio Live (Delira, 2006)

Books 
 A Arte da Improvisação (Lumiar Editora, 1991)
 The Brazilian Guitar Book (Sher Music, 1996)
 Escalas, Arpejos e Acordes para violao e guitarra (Lumiar Editora, 1999)
 Inside the Brazilian Rhythm Section (Sher Music, 2002)
 Toque Junto Bossa Nova (Lumiar Editora, 2008)
 Harmonia Aplicada ao Violão e à Guitarra (Vitale, 2010)

References 

1963 births
Living people
Brazilian jazz guitarists
People from Belo Horizonte